Petr Forejt (born 18 February 1968) is a Czech sound engineer. He was nominated for an Academy Award in the category Best Sound for the film Wanted. He has worked on more than 40 films since 1990.

Selected filmography
 Wanted (2008)

References

External links

1968 births
Czech audio engineers
Living people
Mass media people from Prague